Ahmadabad-e Khanliq (also Romanized as Aḩmadābād-e Khānlīq; also known as Aḩmadābād, Aḩmadābād-e Khānleq, Aḩmadābād Khānleq, and Akhmedabad) is a village in Kaghazkonan-e Shomali Rural District, Kaghazkonan District, Meyaneh County, East Azerbaijan Province, Iran. At the 2006 census, its population was 122, in 31 families.

References 

Populated places in Meyaneh County